Julian Tuwim Monument or the Tuwim's Bench is a monument dedicated to Julian Tuwim at the Piotrkowska Street district of Łódź, Poland. The monument was constructed in 1998-1999 by sculptor Wojciech Gryniewicz.

Television
2012: TVP- "Łódź kreatywna - WOJCIECH GRYNIEWICZ"

Prizes for Wojciech Gryniewicz
 2003: Julian Tuwim Monument ("Ławeczka Tuwima")- The Best Art Sculptures 2003 – I Prize
 2005: Julian Tuwim Monument ("Ławeczka Tuwima")- Prize Poland's Travel, Ministry of Culture and National Heritage (Poland)

References
Notes

External links
Julian Tuwim Monument youtube.com
Julian Tuwim Monument youtube.com
Julian Tuwim Monument/ Ławeczka Tuwima Official website facebook.com
Wojciech Gryniewicz Official website facebook.com

Monuments and memorials in Poland
1999 sculptures
Bronze sculptures in Poland
Outdoor sculptures in Poland